Hrašenski Vrh is a small dispersed settlement above Hrastje in the Municipality of Radenci in northeastern Slovenia.

References

External links 
Hrašenski Vrh on Geopedia

Populated places in the Municipality of Radenci